The Valea Rea is a right tributary of the river Tecucel in Romania. It flows into the Tecucel in Dobrinești.

References

Rivers of Romania
Rivers of Galați County